Pripek is a village in Ruen Municipality, in Burgas Province, in southeastern Bulgaria.

Pripek Point on Graham Coast in Antarctica is named after the village.

References

Villages in Burgas Province